Rhizotrichidae is a family of crustaceans belonging to the order Harpacticoida.

Genera:
 Rhizothrix Sars, 1909
 Tryphoema Monard, 1926

References

Harpacticoida